Jagadamba Shree Puraskar is an award given for contribution to Nepali Language, Literature, Art and Folk Culture Field. It is awarded to a person or an organization who has contributed in the field of Nepali language, literature, art or folk culture fields.

It is presented alongside Madan Puraskar by Madan Puraskar Pustakalaya, on the day of Ghatasthapana; the first day of Dashain festival.

History 
It is named after Rani Jagadamba Kumari Devi, the wife of General Madan Shumsher JBR an daughter in law of Prime Minister Chandra Shumsher JBR. It was established in 1989 (2045 BS) in Nepal. Nepali singer Narayan Gopal was the first to win this award for his contribution to Nepali music. Since 2075 BS, the award prize has been increased to NRs. 400,000.

Criteria 
The criteria for awarding the prize were set on Chaitra 30, 2045 BS based on the suggestion of the members of the organization. When the 'Madan Puraskar' was established in the year 2012 BS, the rules and regulations of the Guthi and the rules related to 'Jagdamba-Shree' were presented by Shri Shambhu Prasad Gyawali.

Some of the criteria based on the official website are:-

 The service of Nepali language is considered as the only basis for the award.
 The award is not given posthumously.
 The award is given to the person / organization among nominees from various fields based on the suggestion and advice by the selection committee which is to be formed every year.

List of winners

See also
Madan Puraskar
Madan Puraskar Pustakalaya
Sajha Puraskar
Padmashree Sahitya Puraskar

References

Notes
1. Year in B.S. = Year in C.E. + 56\57; 2077 B.S. = 2020/2021
2.Accepted by Dr. Mahesh Raj Panta on behalf of the organization

External links 

 Official website
 Photos of ceremony and acceptance speech of winners in Nepali language (Yearwise)



1989 establishments in Nepal
Nepalese art
Nepalese culture
Nepalese literary awards
Awards established in 1989